Dandepalle or Dandepally may refer to:

 Dandepalle, Hanamkonda district, a village in Telangana, India
 Dandepalle, Mancherial district, a village in Telangana, India
 Dandepalle mandal, a subdivision of Mancherial district